"Time Passes By" is a song written by Jon Vezner and Susan Longacre, and recorded by American country music artist Kathy Mattea.  It was released in March 1991 as the first single and title track from the album Time Passes By. The song reached #7 on the Billboard Hot Country Singles & Tracks chart. The song features Trisha Yearwood on harmony vocals.

Chart performance

Year-end charts

References

1991 singles
Kathy Mattea songs
Song recordings produced by Allen Reynolds
Mercury Records singles
Songs written by Susan Longacre
1991 songs
Songs written by Jon Vezner